Chris Jones (born May 24, 1987) is an American professional stock car racing driver.

Racing career

Camping World Truck Series
Jones has made 77 starts in the Camping World Truck Series. He attempted to make his debut in 2007 for his family team LCS Motorsports, but failed to qualify and he drove 3 races for Bobby Dotter that year. In 2008, Jones drove for both teams once again. In 2009, he drove 10 races for LCS Motorsports, 2 for CHS Motorsports and 1 for GunBroker Racing. In 2010, Jones drove only for LCS team, except one attempt that was for Ray Hackett Racing but he failed to make the field. In 2011, was the final year that he drove for his family team, and he also drove one race for RSS Racing. In 2012, Jones split between SS-Green Light Racing and RSS Racing. In 2013, he drove only for RSS team, starting and parking almost all the races.

Personal life
Chris is the Tire Specialist from RSS Racing.

Motorsports career results

NASCAR
(key) (Bold – Pole position awarded by qualifying time. Italics – Pole position earned by points standings or practice time. * – Most laps led.)

Camping World Truck Series

References

External links
 

Living people
1987 births
NASCAR drivers
People from Forest, Virginia